is a Sanriku Railway Company railway station located in Yamada, Iwate Prefecture, Japan.

Lines
Orikasa Station is served by the Rias Line, and was located 64.3 rail kilometers from the terminus of the line at Sakari Station. Formerly, it was served by the JR East Yamada Line.

Station layout
Orikasa Station have a single side platform serving traffic in both directions.  The station was unattended.

Adjacent stations

History

Orikasa Station opened on 10 November 1936. The station was absorbed into the JR East network upon the privatization of the Japan National Railways (JNR) on April 1, 1987. The station was washed away by the March 11, 2011 Tōhoku earthquake and tsunami. As of 2018, the station was rebuilt along with the rest of the closed segment of the Yamada Line. Its location is somewhat north of the original site flooded by the tsunami. It was transferred to the Sanriku Railway upon completion on 23 March 2019. This segment joined up with the Kita-Rias Line on one side and the Minami-Rias Line on the other, which together constitutes the entire Rias Line. Accordingly, this station became an intermediate station of Rias Line.

Surrounding area
  National Route 45
 Orikasa Post Office

References

External links
 JR East Station information 

Railway stations in Japan opened in 1935
Railway stations in Iwate Prefecture
Rias Line
Railway stations in Japan opened in 1936
Yamada, Iwate